Boreotrophon gaidenkoi is a species of sea snail, a marine gastropod mollusk in the family Muricidae, the murex snails or rock snails.

Description

Distribution

References

 Houart, R., 1995. Descriptions of three new Trophoninae species (Gastropoda: Muricidae) from the northwest Pacific. Venus 54(1): 17–23

External links
 MNHN, Paris: holotype

Gastropods described in 1995
Boreotrophon